Kōshō-ji is a Sōtō Zen in temple in Japan. It bears an abbreviated form of the name of the temple established by Eihei Dōgen in Kyoto, Kōshōhōrin-ji, but it was established four centuries after that temple was destroyed, and in a different location.

References

Religious organizations established in the 1230s
Soto temples
Buddhist temples in Kyoto Prefecture
1230s establishments in Japan
1236 establishments in Asia
Dōgen